The Union of Populars (Greek: Ένωσις Λαϊκών) was a coalition of Greek right-wing political parties for the elections of 1958.

Its main leader was Konstantinos Tsaldaris. Members to the coalition were:
People's Party
Popular Social Party
Party of Nationalists
Reform Party
 and other small right-wing parties

See also
List of political parties in Greece

Eastern Orthodox political parties
Conservative parties in Greece
Defunct political party alliances in Greece
1950s in Greek politics
Political parties established in 1957
1957 establishments in Greece
Political parties disestablished in 1958
1958 disestablishments in Greece